JNJ-26489112 is an anticonvulsant drug being developed by Johnson & Johnson for the treatment of epilepsy.  JNJ-26489112 was designed as a successor to topiramate. It is expected to have fewer side effects than topiramate because it lacks activity against carbonic anhydrase.

JNJ-26489112 was studied as a treatment for major depressive disorder. This clinical trial was terminated in 2013 due to a "sponsor portfolio decision", and no new development of JNJ-26489112 has been reported.

Its mechanism of action is unknown.

See also 
 JNJ-26990990

References

Further reading 

 Toxicological study of JNJ-26489112:  

Anticonvulsants
Antidepressants
Benzodioxans
Johnson & Johnson brands
Sulfamides
Chloroarenes